No Money Enterprise (often abbreviated as NME) are a Samoan Australian hip hop group formed in 2019 in Logan City, Queensland. Consisting of members Rndy Svge, Tommy OT & Ha’i Braa, their musical style combines elements of drill music and hip hop. They are best known for their debut single "German".

No Money Enterprise have received multiple award nominations—"German" not only going gold in 2 different countries they also went platinum as well as receiving a nomination for Most Performed Hip Hop / Rap Work at the 2021 APRA Awards and "Presto" was nominated in the Hip Hop / Rap category at the 2021 Queensland Music Awards.

Career

2019–present: "German" and "No Reason"
No Money Enterprise formed in Logan City, Queensland in 2019. The group rose to prominence in November 2019 with the release of their debut single "German". The song gained traction on the social media app TikTok. On 1 May 2020, they released the single "No Reason". On 17 June, No Money Enterprise signed with booking agency New World Artists. On 2 October, they released the single "Presto". On 8 April 2021, "Presto" received a nomination in the Hip Hop / Rap category at the 2021 Queensland Music Awards. On 26 November 2021, they performed a cover of the Notorious B.I.G.'s song "Mo Money Mo Problems" for Australian youth broadcaster Triple J's Like a Version segment, in addition to a performance of their song "German". On 3 December 2021, the cover was digitally released. Australian popular culture website Junkees David James Young ranked the cover at number 32 out of 38 in his list of the best Like a Version covers of 2021, stating "[the] Biggie classic doesn't quite meld with the Enterprise's style." On 25 February 2022, they released the single "Troublesome", a collaboration with rappers Section 60 & Bently. On 19 March, they released the single "Riding", a collaboration with Bently. On 30 March, they premiered the single "Bosque" on Triple J's program Good Nights with Bridget Hustwaite. "Bosque", featuring Bently, Vita and Redback, was released later that same day.

Their debut EP is scheduled for release on 3 February 2023.

Band members
Current members
 Rndy $vge – vocals (2019–present)
 Tommy OT – vocals (2019–present)
 Ha’i Braa – vocals (2019–present)

Personal lives
Each of the band members have Polynesian heritage. In an interview with Triple J about the success of "German", Rndy $vge said:

Musical style and influences
No Money Enterprise's musical style incorporates genres such as hip hop and drill.

Discography

Extended plays

Singles

Promotional singles

Notes

Awards and nominations

APRA Awards
The APRA Awards are several award ceremonies run in Australia by the Australasian Performing Right Association (APRA) to recognise composing and song writing skills, sales and airplay performance by its members annually.

! 
|-
! scope="row"| 2021
| "German"
| Most Performed Hip Hop / Rap Work
| 
| 
|}

Queensland Music Awards

! 
|-
! scope="row"| 2021
| "Presto"
| Hip Hop / Rap
| 
| 
|}

References

External links
 

2019 establishments in Australia
Australian hip hop groups
Drill musicians
Logan City
Musical groups established in 2019
Musical groups from Brisbane
Musical quartets